Francisco Lopes Suasso
Francisco Lopes de Gomara
Francisco Santos (swimmer, born 1962), also known as Francisco Lopes dos Santos and Francisco Lopes Santos

See also